Chris Vail (born 24 May 1977) is a Canadian musician from Calgary, Alberta.

Discography

With Key To The City
2009: Owls Of Getchü (self-released/Saved By Radio)

With Vailhalen
2005: Pop Violence (Saved By Radio)
2004: Becs d'Oiseaux (Saved By Radio)

With XL Birdsuit 
2003: Kisses (self-released/Saved By Radio)
2002: In Minotaur City (Flood Records)

With Shecky Formé
2001: 11 Objects Lost And Found (compilation) (Catch And Release)
2000: 002 (Boonbox)

References

1977 births
Living people
Canadian indie rock musicians
Musicians from Calgary